Greg Bluestein is an American journalist, author and TV analyst who covers Georgia politics for The Atlanta Journal-Constitution. He has also written about former President Jimmy Carter and covered regional and national news as an Atlanta-based journalist for The Associated Press. He contributes to the Political Insider blog, is an MSNBC and NBC News contributor, and is host of the Politically Georgia podcast.

Career
Bluestein was born in Atlanta, Georgia and graduated from North Springs High School and the University of Georgia (political science and journalism), where he was editor of The Red & Black campus newspaper.

Bluestein spent seven years with the Associated Press, between 2005 and 2012, where he covered breaking news, politics and legal affairs. He reported on the execution of Troy Davis, the post-presidency of Jimmy Carter and the Deepwater Horizon Oil Spill, the Upper Big Branch Mine explosion and the major tornado outbreak of 2011 in Alabama and Georgia.

He joined the Atlanta Journal-Constitution in 2012 to write about the political trends that shaped the region. He covered the 2014 race for governor between Nathan Deal and Jason Carter and the 2016 and 2020 presidential elections. He has examined how Joe Biden won Georgia in 2020 and documented the political ascent of Stacey Abrams, Brian Kemp, Jon Ossoff, Raphael Warnock and David Perdue.

During the 2016 presidential campaign, Bluestein contributed to a series of articles examining political change in the "Shifting South." He also has reported Georgia-related news from the Panama Canal Zone and Israel.

Bluestein was dubbed Georgia's "chief political reporter" in an article in Atlanta Magazine and the state's "ace" politics journalist by Chris Cillizza.  He speaks often to audiences about state politics and journalism. He has served as a Visiting Practitioner for the Applied Politics Program at UGA and the Public Affairs Communication Program. His willingness to mentor students and share his expertise are well known.  

He was named to UGA's 40 Under 40 Honorees in 2021.  He delivered the convocation address at UGA's Grady College in 2021. Axios named him the “most dedicated” Georgia fan at the 2023 college football national championship when he attended the Los Angeles game shortly after being hospitalized in San Diego with a kidney stone.

On stage at a Donald Trump rally in 2022, he was dubbed "Buttstein" by former State Representative Vernon Jones.

He is an MSNBC and NBC News political contributor and author of Flipped, published in 2022, on Georgia's transformation into a swing state. He is a winner of the 2021 Toner Prize for Local Political Reporting for a project on Georgia's role in the 2021 United States Capitol attack.

Books
 Flipped: How Georgia Turned Purple and Broke the Monopoly on Republican Power (Viking, 2022)

References

External links 
 Greg Bluestein bio and recent articles, ajc.com
 Press On - Greg Bluestein
 Gregory Bluestein - C-SPAN.org

The Atlanta Journal-Constitution people
21st-century American journalists
Jewish American journalists
American political journalists
American male journalists
People from Sandy Springs, Georgia
University of Georgia alumni
Associated Press reporters
Writers from Atlanta
1982 births
Living people